Fereydunkenar (also Romanized as Fereydūnkenār, Fereydūn Kenār, Fāridūn Kinār, and Fereidun Kenar; also known as Qaşabeh) is a city and capital of Fereydunkenar County, Mazandaran Province, Iran. In the 2006 census, its population was 34,452, with 9,278 families.

References

Populated places in Fereydunkenar County
Cities in Mazandaran Province
Populated places on the Caspian Sea